Denise Ho Wan-see (born 10 May 1977) is a Hong Kong-based Cantopop singer and actress. She is also a pro-democracy and Hong Kong human rights activist. In 2012, Ho came out as lesbian, the first mainstream Cantonese singer to do so. In 2014, Ho was blacklisted by the Chinese government and by the luxury brand Lancome for her participation in the Umbrella Movement in Hong Kong. Ho is a Canadian citizen.

On 28 December 2021, Ho was arrested by the Hong Kong police under the joint charges of both production and distribution of seditious materials.

Early life and education
Ho was born in Hong Kong. Both of her parents were teachers. She began her primary school education at the Diocesan Girls' Junior School. In 1988, she moved with her parents to Montreal, Canada. Ho first attended Collège Jean de la Mennais, an elementary and middle school in La Prairie, on the South Shore of Montreal, then attended Collège Jean-de-Brébeuf, a Catholic college preparatory secondary school and private college. There, she received a Quebec Diploma of College Studies in Arts and Communications.

In 1996, she returned to Hong Kong to take part in the New Talent Singing Awards (NTSA). Afterwards, she began her studies at Université du Québec à Montréal (UQAM) in graphic design. She was enrolled for only one semester before returning to Hong Kong to kickstart her career.

Career

1996–1999: Career begins 
At age 19, Ho enrolled in the 1996 New Talent Singing Awards and to her stated surprise, won the competition.

This gave her the opportunity to meet Anita Mui, a renowned singer of Cantopop—"queen of Hong Kong movies and…renowned in the… world of Cantonese pop music"—of whom she had been a fan since childhood, and who would become her mentor following her win. This launched her career, and at this time she took on the stage name, "HoCC"; this gave her the opportunity to record an album, and gave her a recording contract with Capital Artists. In the intervening period between the contents win and her first album, Ho toured as a background vocalist with Mui, and hosted various television programs produced by TVB.

2000–2004: Breakthrough 
Ho released her first album "First" in 2001, in her fourth year of the contract with Capital Artists. Produced by Choy Yat Chi of Grasshopper (band), this EP, containing her first single "Thousands More of Me" (千千萬萬個我) and "Home of Glory" (光榮之家), defined with success Ho's style as the rock pop independent female she is up till recent years. She earned the award of “Best New Singer” in various prize presentation ceremonies that year. In October, Capital Artists announced bankruptcy, resulting in the end of Ho's first record label era.

After Capital Artists closed, Ho joined EMI in 2002. Although she was only with the company for a brief 2-year period, it was during this time that her musical talents flourished. She teamed up with Ying C Foo (英師傅) for her first EMI label release, Hocc². The song "Angel Blues" (天使藍), composed by Ho herself, not only reached top spots on music charts, but according to Ho, it is also her "growing up" song.

Another single in the EP, "Rosemary" (露絲瑪莉), written by Wyman Wong, created considerable controversies at the time, as it touched on the topic of lesbianism. This song also marked the beginning of Ho's series of songs containing gay themes.  Following the success of "Rosemary" (露絲瑪莉), Ho continued the story of the two lovers in "Goodbye... Rosemary" (再見...露絲瑪莉) in her first full-length album, “free {love}”.

In 2002, Ho's two singles "Angel Blues" (天使藍) and "Goodbye... Rosemary" (再見...露絲瑪莉) won multiple music awards in Hong Kong, including CASH Golden Sail Music Awards (CASH金帆音樂獎) – "Best Vocal Performance by a Female Artist" for the song "Angel Blues". In the same year, Ho won the renowned "Female Singer Bronze Award" in the Ultimate Song Chart Awards Presentation (叱吒樂壇流行榜頒獎典禮).

In 2003, Ho held a "Music is Live" concert with Andy Hui, who is also an apprentice of Anita Mui. Their performance won praise from the critics, and Ho proved to the audience her abilities to perform live as a musician. Later that year, Ho released her second full-length album "Dress Me Up!".  She was the credited as the producer of the album, indicating that Ho has finally gained full control over her music. In September 2003, Ho's longtime mentor, Anita Mui announced she was diagnosed with cervical cancer. Shortly after the announcement, Anita lost her battle against cervical cancer and died on 30 December 2003.

Between 2003 and 2004, Ho took on the role of hosting TVB's weekly live music show, Jade Solid Gold. In 2004, she appeared in Sammi Cheng's 2004 "Sammi vs. Sammi" concert as a cross-dressing cigarette-smoking admirer of Sammi Cheng. Ho's critically acclaimed performance in the short musical segment not only brought attention to the role she played, but also further established herself as a tremendous live performer. In September 2004, Ho signed a contract with East Asia Music.

2005–2009: Continued success 
The album "Glamorous", which pays tribute to the superstars of the 1980s, was released in January 2005. It also marked the start of a close collaboration between Ho and the Green Mountain Orchestra band. She was named the Orbis Student Ambassador 2005, and visited Hainan in July. In September 2005, Ho performed in the musical Butterfly Lovers (梁祝下世傳奇) as the leading actress, producer and musical director. Her album of the same name gave her three Number 1 singles – "Becoming a Butterfly" (化蝶), "Lawrence and Lewis" (勞斯．萊斯) and "Coffee in a Soda Bottle" (汽水樽裡的咖啡), which are all based on the story of the Butterfly Lovers, with possible homosexual themes. These singles helped her to receive the "Female Singer Silver Award" at the Ultimate Song Chart Awards Presentation 2005 (叱吒樂壇流行榜頒獎典禮).

Ho held her first Hong Kong Coliseum concert "Live in Unity 2006" on 26–28 October 2006. The concert was a great success and was positively received by the public. She decided to stage a second concert, "Live in Unity 2007", on 19–20 January 2007 following the original concert's success. Her single, "We Stand As One", named after the slogan for the "Live in Unity" concerts, was released on 11 January 2007. Recordings of the concert were later released in February 2007. She went on a worldwide tour, performing in Toronto, Canada and Atlantic City, New Jersey.

The significant public attention and positive reception to her music helped her garner the "Female Singer Gold Award" at the Ultimate Song Chart Awards Presentation 2006 (叱吒樂壇流行榜頒獎典禮). She sang the Chinese version of Ayumi Hamasaki's song "Secret", known as "Wounded City Secret" (傷城秘密), for the 2006 movie Confession of Pain. She continued as the Orbis Student Ambassador 2006 and visited Vietnam, and later started her own charitable fund. In 2008, a new album "Ten Days in the Madhouse" was released. She produced this album from the viewpoint of society's outcasts and to raise awareness of mental health issues. She encouraged people to understand and find out more about people with mental illnesses and those who formerly suffered from mental illnesses, and care about their needs and situations. Ho encouraged communication between them and the public, ultimately, to achieve social harmony. "Ten Days in the Madhouse" was Ho's most ambitious project. Yet, with the release of a documentary by Hong Kong director Yan Yan Mak (Butterfly) and an exhibition for charity, Ho showed that a multimedia project by a musician can be about something more important than clothing tie-ins.

In 2009, she followed up her plan from the previous year and organised a free concert called "Happiness is Free" in the outdoor courtyard of Diocesan Boys' School.  She managed to book the place because her father was a teacher there. In June, she began shooting a new TVB sitcom titled O.L. Supreme with Liza Wang. In July, she released her new song "The Old Testament" (舊約) and announced that she would hold her "SUPERGOO" themed concerts from 9–12 October that year. Following the concerts, Ho took on a role in the new stage comedy "Man and Woman, War and Peace" (男人與女人之戰爭與和平) directed by Edward Lam. The stage comedy was presented on 13–16 November at Kwai Tsing Theatre in Hong Kong.

2010–2015: Political awakening 
In 2010, Ho appeared in the film Life Without Principle directed by Johnnie To. In September 2010, her first Mandarin album "Nameless Poem" (無名．詩) was released in Taiwan and Hong Kong, and she held "Homecoming" concerts in Hong Kong in December 2010. In 2011, Ho received her first nomination in the 22nd Golden Melody Awards as “Best Mandarin Female Singer”.

In 2012, she was nominated in the 49th Golden Horse Award for “Best Actress” for her performance in the movie “Life Without Principle”. In the same year, she came out as gay at the fourth annual Hong Kong Pride Parade, becoming the first "mainstream female singer in Hong Kong to come out of the closet". Since then, Ho has been actively involved in striving for LGBT rights.

In 2013, Ho continued the tour of her play, “Awakening”, in Singapore and in many cities in China. She released her second Mandarin album, “Coexistence”, which touches upon the theme of loving others despite differences. Ho received her second nomination in the 25th Golden Melody Awards as “Best Mandarin Female Singer” in 2014.

At the end of 2014, the Umbrella Movement emerged in Hong Kong. Ho was a staunch supporter of the movement, and was later arrested when the police cleared the protest camps. Her active participation in Hong Kong's large-scale social movement led her to be blacklisted and banned from performing in China.

2015–present: Independent artist
In March 2015, Ho's contract with Media Asia Music (previously named as East Asia Music) expired. She announced in her Facebook and newspaper column in Apple Daily that she would become an independent artist. Afterwards, she organized multiple events on her own: “Reimagine Live”, a self-funded concert in Taiwan, and a local charity market co-organized with Nomad Nomad. On 19–24 August 2015, she also held a self-funded concert “Reimagine HK18” in Hong Kong Queen Elizabeth Stadium.

On 7–10 October 2016, Ho returned to the Hong Kong Coliseum for her first crowdfunded concert “Dear Friend,”. As she was banned and blacklisted by China, Ho could not find any powerful sponsor that would support her shows. So she came up with a crowdfunding alternative she called “Togetherly Exclusive.” She invited individuals and small and medium enterprises to pledge sponsorship for the event. Eventually, sponsored by over 300 small enterprises and individuals, the four-day concert was successfully held and revisited 24 of the singer's greatest hits.

Approaching the end of 2016, Ho was selected by the BBC as one of the “100 Women 2016”.

From the end of 2017 to 2018, she went on a worldwide tour called “Dear Self, Dear World”, performing in Britain, Taiwan and the United States and Canada. She originally planned to continue the tour in Malaysia, but was forced to cancel as her visa application was rejected by the Immigration Department of Malaysia.

In May 2018, Ho published a new song “Polar”, marking her first attempt to write lyrics for a song. In September, Ho collaborated with Taiwanese band Chthonic on their song Millennia's Faith Undone, which required her to sing in Taiwanese Hokkien. Later, an acoustic version of the song was also released.

At the end of 2018, she successfully organized a 6-day event called “On The Pulse Of” Festival in Hong Kong Science Park. The event is a combination of local market, music festival and Ho's concert. She tried to invite Chthonic to perform together in the festival, but the band's work visa application was denied. Eventually, Ho managed to make a joint performance on stage with Chthonic in her concert through video chat.

In 2019, Ho started to become an active speaker in international human rights forum. In May 2019, Ho was invited to participate in Oslo Freedom Forum. She made a speech on the topic “Under the umbrella : Creative dissent in Hong Kong” and performed “Polar” to the audience. Followed by that is Hong Kong's anti-extradition law amendment bill protests. Ho, as a Canto-pop star turned activist, got worldwide media coverage due to her active participation in the movement. On 8 July, she attended the United Nations Human Rights Council's meeting in Geneva. During her short speech, she called on the council to remove China from the body and convene an urgent session to protect Hongkongers, sparking two interruptions by Chinese delegate Dai Demao. On 20 August, Ho participated in Singularity University's (SU) annual Global Summit and did a keynote speech about how Hong Kong people utilize technology in their social movements.

On 29 December 2021, Ho and five other people linked to Stand News, including barrister Margaret Ng, were arrested by Hong Kong Police on suspicion of breaching the colonial-era law covering conspiracy to print or distribute seditious materials.
Ho is a Canadian citizen who partly grew up in Montreal; a Canadian government spokesman expressed concern about the arrests and stated that Canada and its allies would issue a statement.

Activism
When asked about the origins of her "passion for freedom of expression," Ho replied to reporter Frédéric Lelièvre of La Presse that it was probably from her being an adolescent in Montreal at the time of the 1995 Quebec referendum.

LGBT issues
Ho proudly announced herself as "tongzhi" (Cantonese: tung4 zi3), a Chinese slang term for homosexuals, at age 35, at the fourth annual Hong Kong Pride Parade on 10 November 2012.

Sara Gates of The Huffington Post reports that the various Hong Kong media outlets had indicated that Ho was the first "mainstream female singer in Hong Kong to come out of the closet." Since then, Ho has been involved in the Big Love Alliance (大愛同盟), a civil rights group striving equal rights for the LGBT community. This marks the start of her involvement in striving LGBT rights.

Days later, she watched in appalled amazement as the city's parliament struck down a motion to launch a public consultation on LGBT discrimination.

"It wasn't about gay marriage, nothing serious like that, just trying to do a public survey and it was blocked," she said. "I was so angry back then, and that was the first time I saw how unfair the system is, how the government controlled everything."

Ho faced a visa refusal by Malaysia in February 2018, which forced her to cancel the concert in April, allegedly related to her stance on LGBT and her LGBT identity.

Pro-democracy activism

In 2014, Ho made her stance clear when police fired tear gas in a futile attempt to disperse thousands of mostly-young pro-democracy protesters who had taken to the streets for the "Umbrella Movement".

"That was an enraging moment for me and for many other Hong Kong people," Ho said. "As a celebrity, as a public persona, as an adult, you have to speak out in support of these students and these other Hong Kong citizens."

She took to the streets herself, becoming one of the movement's most outspoken supporters, and one of the last to be hauled off by the police when they cleared the protest camps.

On 5 June 2016, French cosmetics brand Lancôme cancelled a promotional concert by Denise Ho that was scheduled to be held on 19 June in Sheung Wan. This action was taken in response to a boycott campaign launched by the Communist Party-controlled Global Times, which accused her of supporting Hong Kong and Tibet independence, and backlash from mainland Chinese internet users. Lancôme added, in a Facebook post, that Ho is not a spokesperson for the brand. The Tibet allegation appeared to have stemmed from Ho's May 2016 meeting with the Dalai Lama. Ho says that citizens' wish for self-rule is not a crime.

Shortly after the Lancôme incident, Ho announced a crowd-sponsorship campaign named "Togetherly Exclusive Sponsorship" for her Hong Kong Coliseum concert "Dear Friend,”. It was planned to be held in October of the same year, in response to being avoided by corporates.

Approaching the end of 2016, Ho was selected by the BBC as one of the “100 Women 2016”.

In 2019, Ho became an active speaker in international human rights forum. In May 2019, Ho was invited to participate in Oslo Freedom Forum, a global platform for human rights defenders to share their stories. She made a speech on the topic “Under the umbrella : Creative dissent in Hong Kong” and performed “Polar” to the audience.

Followed by that was her response to Hong Kong's anti-extradition law amendment bill protests. Ho got worldwide media coverage due to her supposed active participation in the movement.

On 8 July, she attended the United Nations Human Rights Council's (UNHRC) meeting in Geneva. She asked the United Nations (UN) and the international community to protect the people of Hong Kong from infringements on their freedoms, saying that human rights were under "serious attack" in Hong Kong, and called on the UN to remove China from the Human Rights Council. According to Ho, China has engaged in kidnappings, jailed activists, disqualified pro-democracy lawmakers, and restricts universal suffrage. Her speech was interrupted twice by Chinese diplomat Dai Demao, who asserted Chinese sovereignty over Hong Kong. Dai accused Ho of "[mentioning] Hong Kong side-by-side with China", which he called an "affront" and accused her of using "abusive language."

Her speech at the UNHRC was in reference to the China extradition bill protests and the ongoing freedom and democracy movement in Hong Kong. Speaking about the protests, Ho stated that police engage in excessive force, and that if the Hong Kong government continues to ignore citizen demands the opposition movement will continue. During an interview prior to the UN session, Ho called Beijing's abuses a global issue, and mentioned Tibet and Xinjiang as regions also suffering from human rights violations.

On 20 August, Ho participated in Singularity University's (SU) annual Global Summit and did a keynote speech about how Hong Kong people utilize technology in their social movements. She attended the following events: Antidote 2019, a festival organized by the Sydney Opera House; "Be Water: Hong Kong vs China", a seminar co-organized with Badiucao in Melbourne; and this year's second Oslo Freedom Forum, which will take place in Taiwan.

On 17 September, Ho and other activists participated in a Congressional-Executive Commission on China (CECC) commission in the United States Capitol. She emphasized that the Hong Kong police were using excessive violence on the protesters, and urged the U.S. Congress to pass the Hong Kong Human Rights and Democracy Act. In response, Chinese Foreign Ministry spokesman Geng Shuang called for foreign legislatures to not interfere in China's internal affairs. Ho rejected this in her testimony, saying, "This is not a plea for so-called foreign interference. This is a plea for democracy."

A 90-minute documentary film produced by Sue Williams, Denise Ho: Becoming the Song, released on 1 July 2020 in solidarity with the protest, marking the 23rd anniversary of Britain's handover of Hong Kong to China in 1997.

On 11 May 2022, Ho was arrested under the charge of "colluding with foreign forces" by the national security police.

Discography

Studio albums
first. (EP) (2001)
hocc² (EP) (2002)
free {love} (2002)
Dress Me Up (2003)
Glamorous (2005)
Butterfly Lovers (2005)
Our Time Has Come (2006)
What Really Matters (2007)
Ten Days in the Madhouse (2008)
Heroes (2009)
Unnamed.Poem (2010)
Awakening (2011)
Coexistence (2013)
Recollections (2013)

Compilation albums
Roundup (New + Best Selection) (2003)
Goomusic Collection 2004-2008 (2008)

Live albums
HOCC Live in Unity (2007)
Supergoo · Live (2009)
Coexistence · Legacy Taipei Live (2013)
Memento Live 2013 (2014)
Reimagine Live 2015 (2015)
Dear Friend, Concert 2016 Live (2017)
Dear Self, Dear World · Live in Montreal (2019)
On the Pulse of HOCC 2018 Live (2019)

Filmography

Film
1998 – Rumble Ages (烈火青春)
1999 - Anti Crime Squad
2000 – The Slayer of Demons (妖怪傳) – Voice only: Sakuya (聲演: 神木櫻夜)
2003 – 1:99
2003 – Naked Ambition (豪情)
2003 – Anna in Kungfuland (安娜與武林)
2003 – Hidden Track (尋找周杰倫)
2006 – Superstition
2007 – The Simpsons Movie (阿森一族大電影) – Hong Kong Voice only: Bart Simpson
2008 – Kung Fu Panda (功夫熊貓) – Hong Kong Voice only: Tigress
2009 – Look for a Star (游龍戲鳳)
2010 – 72 Tenants of Prosperity (72家租客)
2010 – Merry-Go-Round (東風破)
2011 – Kung Fu Panda (功夫熊貓) – Hong Kong Voice only: Tigress
2011 – Life Without Principle (奪命金)
2012 – I Love Hong Kong 2012 (2012我愛HK 喜上加囍)
2013 – Young and Dangerous: Reloaded (古惑仔：江湖新秩序)
2020 – Denise Ho: Becoming the Song – documentary film produced by Sue Williams

TV series
1999 – Anti-Crime Squad (反黑先鋒) as 單解心
2004 – Shanghai Legend (上海灘之俠醫傳奇)as 江雪 
2010 – O.L. Supreme (女王辦公室) as Music Miu 繆惜之

Concerts and tours
Live in Unity (2006)
Happiness is Free (2009)
Supergoo (2009)
Homecoming Live (2010)
Memento Live (2013)
 Reimagine Hong Kong (2015)
Dear Friend, (2016)
Dear Self, Dear World (2017-2018)
On The Pulse Of (2018)

International conferences and talks 

 May 2019 – Oslo Freedom Forum (Oslo)
 July 2019 – United Nations Human Rights Council's meeting (Geneva) 
 August 2019 – Singularity University's (SU) annual Global Summit (San Francisco)
 September 2019 – Antidote 2019 by Sydney Opera House (Sydney)
 September 2019 – "Be Water: Hong Kong vs China" Seminar with Badiucao (Melbourne)
September 2019 - Oslo Freedom Forum (Taipei)
October 2019 - Oslo Freedom Forum (New York)
December 2019- TEDWomen — Brilliant and Bold
February 2020- Geneva Summit for Human Rights and Democracy — (Geneva)

Awards and nominations 
Ho has received numerous awards. As a solo artist she has achieved IFPI's "Top 10 Best-selling Local Artists Award" for 9 consecutive years, making her one of the best-selling artists in Hong Kong. She had also won the title of "Best Female Singer" and "My Favourite Female Singer" in the CRHK Ultimate Song Chart Awards Presentation over the past years, securing her position as a leading pop diva in the city. In recent years, although she is blacklisted by China, she has started up her own record label and continued to produce music. In 2019, she has collaborated with CHTHONIC, a Taiwanese band, to make the song "Millennia's Faith Undone". The song is nominated as "Song of the Year" in the 30th Golden Melody Awards.

Despite her robust music career, she has also made numerous attempts in the area of film and drama. As one of the leading actress in Johnnie To's award-winning film, "Life Without Principles", she had received recognition for her performance by achieving nominations and awards in the Hong Kong Film Awards, Golden Horse Awards and Chinese Film Media Awards respectively.

Films

Dramas

Music

See also
 LGBT culture in Hong Kong
 2014 Umbrella Revolution
 2019–20 Hong Kong protests

References

External links

Denise Ho's Official Blog
Denise Ho's Former Official Blog 

1977 births
Activists from Montreal
Actresses from Montreal
Hong Kong contraltos
Hong Kong emigrants to Canada
20th-century Hong Kong women singers
Hong Kong film actresses
Hong Kong television actresses
Lesbian singers
Hong Kong lesbian actresses
Hong Kong lesbian musicians
Hong Kong LGBT rights activists
Lesbian actresses
Living people
Naturalized citizens of Canada
New Talent Singing Awards contestants
Singers from Montreal
Hong Kong democracy activists
Hong Kong women activists
BBC 100 Women
20th-century Canadian actresses
20th-century Canadian women singers
20th-century Hong Kong actresses
21st-century Canadian actresses
21st-century Canadian women singers
21st-century Hong Kong actresses
21st-century Hong Kong women singers
Women civil rights activists
20th-century Hong Kong LGBT people
21st-century Hong Kong LGBT people